

References 

Additional references

 
 
 

U